The 2022 French Road Cycling Cup is the 31st edition of the French Road Cycling Cup. There are 17 events, with the Mercan'Tour Classic Alpes-Maritimes making its debut in the competition and joining the usual 16 events from previous years.

Events

Cup standings 
, after the Tour de Vendée

All competing riders are eligible for the individual general classification, but only those younger than 25 on 1 January 2022 are eligible for the young rider classification. Additionally, only French teams are eligible for the teams classification.

Individual

Young rider classification

Teams

References

External links 
  

French Road Cycling Cup
2022
Road Cycling